Futuracha Pro is a typeface designed by Odysseas Galinos Paparounis.
 The appearance of individual letters adjusts automatically depending on the words typed. The shape and design of the font, which has Art Deco stylings, were inspired by the movements of a cockroach.

References

Typefaces